Passee is a municipality in the Nordwestmecklenburg district, in Mecklenburg-Vorpommern, Germany.

References

Nordwestmecklenburg